is a chibi-style parody spin-off based on Neon Genesis Evangelion. It includes a series of 3D CGI ONAs released from 2007 to 2009, two manga series published in Kadokawa Shoten Shōnen Ace (Petit Eva: Evangelion@School) and Kerokero Ace magazines, a 2008 Nintendo DS video game, and also various merchandize. There is no dialogue in the series.

Plot
The series is a parody of Neon Genesis Evangelion, in which the entire cast of the original series are now everyday students going to junior high school together at Tokyo-3; similar to the manga Neon Genesis Evangelion: Angelic Days. The series features three "Rei sisters": one is a child younger than the rest based on "Rei 1", the second is based on "Rei 2" (the Rei seen for most of the normal series), and the third Rei is actually based on the hyperactive and klutzy "Alternate Rei" seen in the alternate-reality dream sequence from the final episode of the original series. Further, Evangelion Unit 01 itself is one of their classmates, but this time as a human-sized robot.

Media

ONA

The ONA series was initially directed by Shunichirō Miki and produced by Kanaban Graphics. However, since episode 10, the series had been directed by Hiroaki Sakurai and produced by Xebec.

Manga

The manga  was illustrated by Ryusuke Hamamoto and was published by Kadokawa Shoten in Shōnen Ace magazine. Serialization began on May 26, 2007 and ended on September 26, 2009. The series has also been published in Newtype, Dengeki Hobby Magazine, and Figure Oh.  It was collected into two volumes. Another manga illustrated by Maki Ozora, titled  was published in Kerokero Ace magazine from October 26, 2007 to July 26, 2009. It was collected into one volume.

References

External links
Petit Eva official page

Series gets DS game in Japan

2007 anime ONAs
2007 manga
Kadokawa Shoten manga
Neon Genesis Evangelion
Neon Genesis Evangelion manga
Shōnen manga
Xebec (studio)
Parody anime and manga